Kintla Glacier is in Glacier National Park in the U.S. state of Montana. This is a 34 percent decrease in area from 1966.

See also
 List of glaciers in the United States
 Glaciers in Glacier National Park (U.S.)

References

Glaciers of Flathead County, Montana
Glaciers of Glacier National Park (U.S.)
Glaciers of Montana